Mirza Muhammad Khair ud-din, Khurshid Jah Bahadur or, Mirza Khurshid Jah Bahadur (15 October 1914 – 3 August 1975) was born in Rang Mahal, Delhi the only son of Mirza Muhammad Fayazuddin Bahadur, by lineage he was the great-grandson of Shah Alam II, he was recognised as head of the Timurid dynasty, in 1931 by the Government of India, He emigrated to Lahore in Pakistan following the partition of India in 1947,

Family
He was married to Nawabzadi Arghwani Begum Sahiba (born 2 January 1920) and they had two sons and four daughters.
Sons
Mirza Ghulam Moinuddin Muhammad Javaid Jah Bahadur (born 16 May 1946), married to Mrs. Malahat Javaid Jah and has issue, three sons and one daughter
Mirza Shahrukh Shah Jahan Javaid Jah (born 15 April 1978), married Faiza Begum Sahib (born 16 March 1976), they have one daughter.
Hafsa Begum Sahiba (born 16 January 2011)
Darakhshanda Begum Sahiba (born 1 September 1979), married Muhammad Kashif Aslam (born 6 June 1974), she has issue with him, 2 sons and 1 daughter.
Muhammad Nausherwan Kashif Sahib (born 3 July 2000)
Maha Kashif Begum Sahiba (born 29 April 2004)
Ayaan Kashif Sahib (born 2 October 2011)
Mirza Farrukh Javaid Jah (born 13 September 1980), married Sarah Almaee Jafri daughter of Mr. & Mrs. Almaee Hasan Jafri on 1 February 2013 in Lahore, Punjab. He has issue, a son:
Taimur Farrukh Jah Sahib (born 11 February 2014)
Mirza Ziarukh Javaid Jah (born 11 March 1982), married Sharmeen Begum Sahiba, daughter of Aijaz Hussein Kazi, by his wife, Ghazala Begum. He has issue, two daughters:
Eman Begum Sahiba (born 2 June 2010)
Eshal Begum Sahiba (born 23 December 2014)
Mirza Jalaluddin Muhammad Akbar (born 15 September 1947) married to Lubna Akbar Sahiba (born 17 September), they have issue, two sons and two daughters.
Maliha Begum Sahiba (born 10 July 1980), married Khalid Umar Khan, son of Muhammad Umar Khan. She has issue, two daughters:
Zunaira Khalid Khan (born 13 May 2013)
Zaina Khalid Khan (born 26 March 2015)
Mahvash Begum Sahib (born 15 January 1982)
Mirza Jahanzeb Akbar. (born 22 May 1985)
Mirza Aurangzeb Akbar (born 22 January 1987)

Daughters
Sabahat Jah Begum Sahiba (born before 1947), married to Kamran Muzaffar Zeejah (born 12 January 1946), 
Zakawat Jah Begum Sahiba (born after 1950) married to Khayum Rafi Ahmed, they have two sons
Zafar Omar Sher. (born 20 October 1979), married Molly Begum
Kalim Sheikh. (born 1987)
Sahiba (born 23 September 1950) married to Sajid Arif Nomani, they have two sons and one daughter
Ali Arif Nomani (born 6 October 1982)
Hasan Arif Nomani. (born 10 January 1986)
Saba Arif Nomani. (born 12 September 1988)
Nabahat Jah Begum Sahiba (born 9 December 1957) married to Husnain Lotia
Ismat Lotia. (born 30 October 1982)
Qasim Lotia. (30 August 1984-8 July 1991)
Kamil Lotia. (born 3 November 1992)

1914 births
1975 deaths
Mughal dynasty
Mughal nobility
People from Delhi
Pretenders to the throne of the Mughal Empire